Charles D. Franklin (December 11, 1931 – March 16, 1992) was an officer in the United States Army who retired as a lieutenant general.

Early life
Charles Dale Franklin was born in Hugo, Missouri on December 11, 1931, the son of Jewell Franklin and Ethel (Shipman) Franklin. He graduated from the University of Missouri in 1953 with a degree in agriculture and received his second lieutenant's commission in the Field Artillery through the Reserve Officers' Training Corps.

Military career
Franklin graduated from the Field Artillery Officer Basic Course in 1953, and then served with the 1st Cavalry Division during the Korean War.  He completed the Artillery Officer Advanced Course in 1959. In 1962, he graduated from the United States Army Command and General Staff College. He graduated from the United States Army War College in 1970.

Franklin's assignments included tours in Vietnam during the Vietnam War; he commanded first the 116th Attack Helicopter Company, 269th Combat Aviation Battalion, 25th Infantry Division, and later the 2nd Battalion, 20th Field Artillery, 1st Cavalry Division. He served as commander of the 9th Infantry Division Artillery, chief of staff of the 9th Infantry Division, and deputy chief and chief of legislative liaison in the office of the Secretary of the Army. In 1984 he succeeded Donald E. Rosenblum as commander of the First United States Army at Fort Meade, Maryland. He was succeeded in this post by James E. Thompson Jr. and retired in 1987.

Awards and decorations

Additional honors
In 1989, Franklin received the honorary degree of Legum Doctor from the University of Missouri.

Death and burial
Franklin died of heart ailments at Fairfax Hospital in Falls Church, Virginia on March 16, 1992. He was buried at Arlington National Cemetery, Section 30, Grave 246-RH. Survivors included his wife, Pat and three children, Charles, Debby, and Susan.

References

Sources

Newspapers

Internet

Books

Magazines

External links
Lt. Gen. Charles D. Franklin Retirement Ceremony at YouTube.com

1931 births
1992 deaths
People from Camden County, Missouri
United States Army generals
United States Army personnel of the Korean War
United States Army personnel of the Vietnam War
University of Missouri alumni
American Master Army Aviators
United States Army Command and General Staff College alumni
United States Army War College alumni
Recipients of the Distinguished Service Medal (US Army)
Recipients of the Silver Star
Recipients of the Legion of Merit
Recipients of the Distinguished Flying Cross (United States)
Burials at Arlington National Cemetery
United States Army Field Artillery Branch personnel
Military personnel from Missouri